Beresford High School is the main secondary school for grades 9-12 located in Beresford, South Dakota.  It is the only high school in the Beresford School District 61–2.  The school colors are purple and white.  The school mascot is the watchdog.  The school newspaper is the Beresonian.

The following sports are played at the school: football, cross country, boys golf, girls golf, volleyball, wrestling, track, girls basketball, boys basketball, dance, and cheerleading. There are also the following non-athletic programs: marching band, concert band, drama, concert choir, all-state chorus, all-state band, Future Farmers of America, Family Career and Community Leaders of America, school newspaper, school yearbook, quiz bowl, Students Working Against Tobacco, National Honor Society, Meals on Wheels, and student government.

External links
Beresford school district website

Public high schools in South Dakota
Education in Lincoln County, South Dakota
Schools in Union County, South Dakota